FIR: Faizal Ibrahim Raiz is a 2022 Indian Tamil-language crime thriller film written and directed by Manu Anand in his directorial debut and produced by Vishnu Vishal, Shubhra and Aryan Ramesh under the banner of VV Studioz. The film features Vishnu Vishal, Gautham Vasudev Menon, Manjima Mohan, Reba Monica John, Raiza Wilson and Gaurav Narayanan. 

The music is composed by Ashwath and editing by Prasanna GK. The film was released theatrically on 11 February 2022, where it received positive reviews from critics and became an critical and commercial success.

Plot
Irfan Ahmed, an IIT Madras gold medalist based in Triplicane, Chennai, lives with his friends and mother, Praveena Begum, a Sub-Inspector of Police. He is in a relationship with Archana Krishnamoorthy, who is doing her Ph.D. in Delhi, and also befriends a junior lawyer, Prathana Raman. Irfan unsuccessfully attends job interviews, while working part-time with a perfume factory. Tired of being questioned on his religious beliefs during interviews, Irfan decides to join a full-time perfume business, which is headed by Perumal and his son, Karthikeyan. He visits various locations in the country to shop for chemicals. On his way back from Hyderabad, Irfan loses his cellphone. 

Frustrated that he might miss his flight to Chennai, Irfan mistakenly threatens the airport officials that he will bomb Hyderabad, which leads to his arrest, but is released and reaches Chennai. Later, a bomb explodes at the same airport, killing many people. The next day, Irfan's phone is found at the bomb blast site, and Irfan is arrested, yet again. He is detained under the orders of NIA advisor, Ajay Dewan. He is interrogated by NIA officer, Anisha Qureshi, and low-ranking police officer, Gunashekhar. Irfan is believed to be the most wanted terrorist, dubbed Abu Bakr Abdullah. As a result, he is branded as a terrorist and portrayed as the evil incarnate by the media, and undergoes torture under police custody. 

Feeling sorry for Irfan, Prathana decides to represent him and brings Praveena Begum to see him. However, they are denied to visit Irfan. Being an asthmatic patient, Praveena collapses from an attack, due to the humiliation stemming from the public prosecution. Irfan is granted to visit his mother in the hospital, under extreme surveillance of the police. However, he escapes from police custody and finds that Praveena Begum has died, leaving Irfan devastated and escaping from the hospital, where he is met by Dr. Zazi's son Riyaz, who convinces and motivates Irfan to create a sarin gas, to pull off a terrorist attack. Irfan does so, which is eventually tested on Dr. Zazi, when he visits the factory and is shocked to see what was going on. 

Anisha reaches there and surrounds Irfan and Riyaz, but is stabbed by Karthikeyan, who is revealed to be the real Abu Bakr Abdullah. When the bomb is activated, Abu Bakr activates the bomb and tells his henchman to kill Irfan, as he has no use of him, but Irfan overpowers and kills the henchman, where it is revealed that Irfan is actually an undercover NIA agent and waited for years to draw Abu Bakr out of hiding. Archana, who is also an undercover NIA agent, arrives at the factory and finishes off Riyaz, while Irfan kills Abu Bakr. Gunashekhar and the cops surround the factory, under the orders of Ajay Dewan. After getting permission from the 
Defense Minister, a government-sanctioned drone, fires a military missile to the factory. 

Archana tries to persuade Irfan to leave the factory, as it is about to be destroyed. However, he refuses, as he wants to stop the activation of the sarin gas. The factory is destroyed by the missile, seemingly killing Irfan. Ajay Dewan is congratulated for preventing the gas attack. It is revealed that the whole operation was planned by Ajay Dewan, which was only known to very few people. He found an officer with a chemical engineering background and named him Irfan Ahmed, erasing his past life. With the help of Archana, Irfan eliminates Abu Bakr's chemical engineer Ashraf, in order to lure Abu Bakr to India. It is also revealed that Irfan actually escaped from the missile strike of the factory and is on another mission, where his real name is revealed to be Faizal Ibrahim Raiz (FIR).

Cast

Production 
The film started with its principal photography in October 2019 and the shooting for the same started in December 2019. The shooting was wrapped up by February 2021 and moved into post-production then.
The movie was banned in Malaysia, Qatar and Kuwait.

Music 
The songs of the film are composed by Ashwath. The music label of the film were  acquired by VV Studioz and Divo Music

Release

Theatrical 
The film was released theatrically on 11 February 2022. The film opened to positive reviews from critics and audience praising the cast performances, action sequences, cinematography, production values, writing and direction.

Home Media
The digital streaming rights of the film was bought by Amazon Prime Video and the satellite rights of the film was bought by Star Vijay.

Reception

Critical Response 
M Suganth of The Times of India gave the film’s rating 3.0 out of 5 and wrote "Thankfully, the rapid editing (GK Prasanna) and the pulsating background score (by Ashwath) ensure that the film manages to move at a breakneck pace, and manage to stop us from thinking about logic and help the film keep us engaged." Indiaglitz gave the film’s rating 3 out of 5 and stated that "Go for this action packed thriller with a few interesting twists and turns." Manoj Kumar R of The Indian Express gave 3.5 out of 5 stars, stating that "The writing in the first half is shaky as the scenes and the functioning of the country’s top security agencies plays out like an uninformed melodrama. We have an inspector-ranking officer in the NIA, who thinks the coded message that he managed to secure from a terrorist would somehow make him a laughing stock at the office and keeps it to himself. We have a girl, who is not allowed to ask too many questions. Her only job is to book flight tickets at the orders of her seniors. We have a surveillance expert who stands so close to the people he follows that they could hear him breathe. And then we have a clownish YouTuber, who is also an expert computer hacker. He has been trusted with the responsibility of keeping tabs on a communication network used by terror groups. And he loses some life-saving information because he was too busy eating his burger in his underwear at the library of the NIA office." Behindwoods gave the film 2.5 out of 5 stars, stating that "Vishnu Vishal's acting, the solid writing makes FIR a gripping and engaging watch." Srinivasan Ramanujam of The Hindu wrote after reviewing the film that "Despite being a thriller, FIR also manages to throw in some powerful moments, but could have done well to avoid some unnecessary over the-top elements that seem to dilute its core premise in the first place." Navein Darshan of The Cinema Express gave 3.5 out of 5 stars and wrote "Most of us would have had this question on our mind for long: "Where are our Muslim protagonists?" The void for Muslim leads is finally being filled by Khaliqs and Irfans now. But it is undoubtedly scarring to realise that we as a society are still making them scream, "We are not terrorists!" Hopefully, one fine day we will get to see our Wizams and Mohammads dancing to intro songs, cracking jokes and taking on evil kingpins, just like our Karthiks and Shivas." Haricharan Pudipeddi of Hindustan Times stated after reviewing the film that "FIR has some smart, well-written twists for a thriller. As the twists untangle themselves in the end, the film feels more complete." Bhavana Sharma of Pinkvilla gave 2.5 out of 5 and wrote "On the whole, this film is worth watching this weekend. You should stop looking and asking for logic and then just engage yourself in the tale." Ashameera Aiyappan of Firstpost gave the film 2.5 out of 5 and stated "FIR has its heart in the right place. And the questions it asks are incredibly pertinent. Irfan begins to retaliate only when he is forced to the corner. And when he says that he is done trusting the system and its judiciary -- the emotion hits home. After all, we live in dystopian times where minorities are consistently pushed away from the doors of justice. But good intentions don’t always make for good cinema."

Box Office 
According to reports from Times of India, the film had a biggest opening and grossed more than 8 crores at the Tamil Nadu box office.

References

External links 
 

2022 action thriller films
2022 directorial debut films
Films about terrorism in India
Indian action thriller films
2022 multilingual films
2020s Tamil-language films
2020s English-language films
Films about Islam
Films about Islamic terrorism
Films set in Delhi
Films set in Hyderabad, India
Fictional portrayals of the Tamil Nadu Police
Islam in popular culture
Films about jihadism
Films about social issues in India
Islam in fiction
Indian multilingual films